Hengsha Station is an elevated station on Line 6 of the Guangzhou Metro. The station is located at Jinshazhou Road  Hengsha Section on the island of Jinshazhou in the Baiyun District of Guangzhou. It started operation on 28December 2013.

Station layout

Exits

References

Guangzhou Metro stations in Baiyun District
Railway stations in China opened in 2013